is a common feminine Japanese given name. Hiroka can be written using different kanji characters and can mean:
博華, "wise flower"
寛香, "tolerant scent/fragrance/aroma"
宏香, "large scent/fragrance/aroma"
広香, "wide scent/fragrance/aroma"
紘佳, "large fine"
紘加, "large gain"
裕加, "rich gain"
The name can also be written in hiragana or katakana.

Notable people
, Japanese violinist
, Japanese professional wrestler
Sarah Sheeva (born 1973 as Hiroka Cidade Gomes), Brazilian gospel singer

Japanese feminine given names